WrestleMania VIII was the eighth annual WrestleMania professional wrestling pay-per-view (PPV) event produced by the World Wrestling Federation (WWF, now WWE). It took place on April 5, 1992, at the Hoosier Dome in Indianapolis, Indiana in the United States. Nine matches were shown during the live broadcast, with one dark match occurring before the event.

Matches held at WrestleMania VIII included WWF Champion Ric Flair defending his title against Randy Savage and Hulk Hogan facing his rival Sid Justice.

Production

Background 
WrestleMania is considered the World Wrestling Federation's (WWF, now WWE) flagship pay-per-view (PPV) event, having first been held in 1985. It is held annually between mid-March to mid-April. It was the first of the WWF's original four pay-per-views, which includes Royal Rumble, SummerSlam, and Survivor Series, which were eventually dubbed the "Big Four". WrestleMania VIII was scheduled to be held on April 5, 1992, at the Hoosier Dome in Indianapolis, Indiana.

Storylines 
The original plan for the main event was the long-awaited bout between Ric Flair and Hulk Hogan for the WWF Championship, the meeting between the two legends was even promoted on television in a mock press conference where WWF President Jack Tunney had announced Hogan as the number one contender to Flair's WWF Championship. Both Flair and Hogan had wrestled against each other in several house show matches and a televised tag match, but not in a televised main event singles match. WrestleMania VIII was changed to a double main event with Hogan wrestling Sid Justice, while Flair wrestled Randy Savage. For storyline purposes, Sid Justice lobbied to wrestle Hulk Hogan due to tensions starting between the two at that year's Royal Rumble, where Hogan was eliminated by Sid Justice. This maneuver on Sid's part led Hogan to helping rival Ric Flair eliminate Justice and then win not only the Royal Rumble but the WWF Championship in the process. This would make Ric Flair only the second man to win both the WWF and NWA World Heavyweight Titles, the first being the original "Nature Boy", Buddy Rogers.

Event 

A scheduled match between the British Bulldog and The Berzerker did not take place due to time constraints. 

The opening bout was a tag team match pitting the Beverly Brothers against the Bushwhackers. The Bushwhackers won the match by pinfall. This was a dark match that did not air on the pay-per-view broadcast.

The pay-per-view broadcast opened with country music singer Reba McEntire performing "The Star-Spangled Banner".

The second bout, and the first bout to air on the pay-per-view broadcast, was a Singles match between Shawn Michaels and Tito Santana. Michaels won the match by pinfall after reversing a body slam attempt into a body press.

Following the second bout, the Legion of Doom and their manager Paul Ellering were interviewed by Gene Okerlund). The Legion of Doom were originally supposed to challenge Money Inc for the WWF Tag Team Championship at WrestleMania VIII but due to Hawk being under suspension until after WrestleMania they were replaced in the match by the Natural Disasters.

The third bout was a singles match between Jake Roberts and the Undertaker. The Undertaker won the match by pinfall after giving Roberts a Tombstone Piledriver outside of the ring.

The fourth bout was a singles match in which WWF Intercontinental Champion Roddy Piper defended his title against Bret Hart. Hart defeated Piper by pinfall after reversing Piper's sleeper hold into a pin, thus winning the WWF Intercontinental Championship.

Following the fourth bout, a pre-recorded interview with Lex Luger aired in which he promoted the World Bodybuilding Federation.

The fifth bout was an eight-man tag team match pitting Big Boss Man, Jim Duggan, Sgt. Slaughter, and Virgil against the Mountie, the Nasty Boys, and Repo Man. Family Feud host Ray Combs was a guest ring announcer for the eight-man tag match. Big Boss Man, Duggan, Slaughter, and Virgil won the match by pinfall when Jerry Sags accidentally punched Brian Knobbs, enabling Virgil to pin Knobbs.

The sixth bout was a singles match in which WWF Champion Ric Flair defended his title against Randy Savage. Savage defeated Flair by pinfall using a roll-up to win the title. At the time the company had a "no blood" policy. Nonetheless, Ric Flair was caught blading directly on camera and was fined several thousand dollars. In one of his first appearances in the WWF, Shane McMahon was one of the backstage officials who attempted to keep Miss Elizabeth away from ringside during the Flair/Savage match. He then restrained Savage in the ensuing brawl after the contest.

The seventh bout was a singles match between Rick Martel and Tatanka. Tatanka won the match by pinfall using a cross body block.

The eighth bout was a tag team match in which WWF Tag Team Champions Money Inc. defended their titles against the Natural Disasters. The Natural Disasters won the bout by countout after Money Inc abandoned the match.

The ninth bout was a singles match between Owen Hart and Skinner. Hart won the match by pinfall using a roll-up.

The main event bout was a singles match between Hulk Hogan and Sid Justice. Hogan won the match by disqualification after Justice's manager Harvey Whippleman intefered. The finish to the Justice-Hogan match actually did not occur as planned - the original plan was for Hogan to hit the leg drop on Justice and for Papa Shango to do a run in and break up the pin causing a disqualification; however, Papa Shango either missed or misjudged his cue and was late in getting down to the ring, causing Justice to have to improvise by kicking out of the leg drop. Following the match, Justice and Shango attacked Hogan until the Ultimate Warrior made a surprise return, helping Hogan drive Justice and Shango away.

Reception 
Critics praised the Intercontinental Championship match between Piper and Hart. Thomas Golianopoulos of Complex Sports ranked it at number 15 in his list of the 50 Greatest Matches in WrestleMania History, describing it as "A stiff match that veers from amateur wrestling to all-out street fight with a great finish." Golianopoulos also ranked the Flair vs. Savage match at number 19 on the same list, praising the in-ring psychology despite an abrupt finish. On the other hand, Dave Meltzer of the Wrestling Observer Newsletter gave the Hogan/Justice main event negative two stars, citing their lackluster performance and the late entry of Papa Shango, which necessitated a hastily rewritten ending. The main event was also ranked by Youtube wrestling channel Cultaholic as the worst WrestleMania main event of all time in their 2019 ranking of every WrestleMania Main Event,  while saying that the WWF Championship Match between Flair and Savage should've been the main event in their 2020 list of 10 WrestleMania Matches That Closed The Show.

Aftermath 
Savage's primary opponent during the spring and summer of 1992 was Ric Flair, with the storyline over Flair's alleged past relationship with Elizabeth continuing to play a major factor. It was revealed later in WWF Magazine that the photos that Flair had shown of himself with Elizabeth were fakes, and that they were actually of Savage and Elizabeth. In real life, Savage and Elizabeth were about to  separate, and did, with Elizabeth making her final WWF appearance on April 19, 1992 at the UK Rampage pay-per-view. WrestleMania VIII marked Elizabeth's last major pay-per-view appearance in the United States for the WWF.

Although Savage and Flair continued feuding, the Elizabeth aspect was dropped from the storyline, and the former couple's divorce was finalized in September 1992. Savage briefly addressed the divorce in an issue of WWF Magazine, but it was otherwise not mentioned in kayfabe.

Shawn Michaels began receiving his first major push as a main-event singles competitor, as he would challenge Randy Savage for the WWF Championship in Europe, while challenging Bret Hart for the WWF Intercontinental Championship in the United States, while occasionally teaming with Ric Flair in tag team matches against Hart and Savage. Michaels eventually won the WWF Intercontinental Championship from The British Bulldog (who had won the title from Hart at the SummerSlam event in London, England in August) in October.

The Hulk Hogan-Sid Justice match was billed as Hogan's "last match", when in actuality, Hogan took a hiatus, due to the steroid scandal which was beginning to emerge in the news media. Piper also took a hiatus from the ring following WrestleMania VIII. Roberts left the company and would return four years later, using a "born-again Christian" gimmick. Sid Justice was largely unsuccessful in post-WrestleMania matches against the Ultimate Warrior and The Undertaker and eventually left the company, returning in 1995.

Results

References

External links 
 
 

1992 in Indiana
1992 WWF pay-per-view events
April 1992 events in the United States
Events in Indianapolis
Professional wrestling in Indianapolis
WrestleMania